Yes, Madam (Italian:Sissignora) is a 1942 Italian romance film directed by Ferdinando Maria Poggioli and starring María Denis, Leonardo Cortese and Emma Gramatica.

Cast

 María Denis as Cristina Zunino  
 Leonardo Cortese as Vittorio  
 Emma Gramatica as Lucia Robbiano  
 Irma Gramatica as Anna Robbiano  
 Rina Morelli as Suor Valeria  
 Evi Maltagliati as La signora Valdata  
 Silverio Pisu as Il piccolo Giorgetto Valdata  
 Roldano Lupi as L'amante de la signora Valdata  
 Dhia Cristiani as Paolina Gatti  
 Jone Salinas as Enrichetta  
 Elio Marcuzzo as Emilio  
 Guido Notari as Pescatori, Il medico 
 Anna Carena as La suora caposala  
 Giovanni Grasso as Il commendator Bracco-Rinaldi  
 Dina Perbellini as Signora Bracco-Rinaldi  
 Dora Bini as Signorina Bracco-Rinaldi  
 Federico Collino as Il maggiordomo 
 Anna Capodaglio
 Elio Dalilla
 Stelvio Rosi
 Giulio Vezza
 Raffaele Vezza

References

Bibliography 
 Reich, Jacqueline & Garofalo, Piero. Re-viewing Fascism: Italian Cinema, 1922-1943. Indiana University Press, 2002.

External links 

1942 films
Italian romance films
1940s romance films
1940s Italian-language films
Films directed by Ferdinando Maria Poggioli
Italian black-and-white films
1940s Italian films